Earthshaker! is a pinball game designed by Pat Lawlor and released by Williams Electronics in 1989. The game features an earthquake theme and was advertised with the slogan "It's a Moving Experience!" Some prototypes have a building that when the shaker motor is activated will fall down but the team removed it due to cost savings.

Earthshaker! was the first pinball machine with a shaker motor that causes the table to rumble along with the theme of the game.

Description
The player assumes the role of an earthquake researcher and has to visit various zones along the California-Nevada border. During the game the two states split apart and becoming a rail for the ball.

Sample games feature an "Earthquake Institute" building that sinks into the playfield. About 200 of these sample machines were produced before this toy was made stationary due to cost savings. Some hobbyists re-add this feature in their custom pinball machines.

The music and voices of the game are typical for its era, although the pinball machine is known for a female voice saying "Bitchin'!" which was unusual for its time. "Family" ROMs that censor the questionable language by omission was developed.

Digital versions
Earthshaker! is no longer available as a licensed table in The Pinball Arcade for any platform after June 29, 2018 - just before WMS license expiration on June 30, 2018.

See also
Whirlwind

References

External links

Williams pinball machines
1989 pinball machines